St. Francis (of Assisi ) in Ecstasy is the title of several paintings:

St. Francis in Ecstasy (Bellini)
St. Francis in Ecstasy (Zurbarán)
Saint Francis of Assisi in Ecstasy (Caravaggio)
Saint Francis of Assisi in Ecstasy (El Greco, 1600)